Lucie Hradecká was the defending champion, but lost in the quarterfinals to Jamie Hampton.

Olga Govortsova won the title, defeating Magdaléna Rybáriková in the final, 6–3, 6–7(6–8), 7–6(7–5).

Seeds

Draw

Finals

Top half

Bottom half

External Links
 Main draw

Dow Corning Tennis Classic - Singles
Dow Corning Tennis Classic